Xiu Xiu is an American experimental rock band, formed in 2002 by singer-songwriter Jamie Stewart in San Jose, California. Currently, the line-up consists of Stewart (the only constant member since formation), Angela Seo, and David Kendrick. The band's name comes from the film Xiu Xiu: The Sent Down Girl, which has influenced the sound of their music, according to Stewart.

Xiu Xiu released their first two albums, Knife Play (2002) and A Promise (2003) on 5 Rue Christine to positive critical reception. In-between the two, the EP Chapel of the Chimes was released via Absolutely Kosher. The compilation album Fag Patrol was released shortly after, and their third studio album Fabulous Muscles was released in 2004. La Forêt was released in 2005 after Caralee McElroy joined the group, and The Air Force followed in 2006. 2008's Women as Lovers was released via the main Kill Rock Stars label in 2008, and McElroy departed the group shortly afterwards.

Dear God, I Hate Myself was released in 2010 and was the first Xiu Xiu album to feature longtime member Angela Seo. Following a signing to Polyvinyl and Bella Union, Xiu Xiu released Always (2012) and Angel Guts: Red Classroom (2014). In between those two projects, the group released a Nina Simone tribute project, Nina, in late 2013 via Graveface Records.

Plays the Music of Twin Peaks (2016) followed, an album consisting of covers from the Twin Peaks soundtracks originally as a Record Store Day exclusive release but re-released by Polyvinyl later that year. Forget (2017) and Girl with Basket of Fruit (2019) were released afterwards, and Xiu Xiu released their latest and twelfth album Oh No in 2021. Their thirteenth album, Ignore Grief, was released in March 2023.

History

2002–2004: Formation and early years
Jamie Stewart formed Xiu Xiu in 2002 after his previous band, Ten in the Swear Jar, disbanded. Stewart and Cory McCulloch continued from the previous group, and were joined by Yvonne Chen and Lauren Andrews. The band's sound was characterized by its use of indigenous instruments and programmed drums in place of traditional rock instruments: harmonium, mandolin, brass bells, gongs, keyboards, and a cross between a guitarrón mexicano and a cello for bass, etc. Stewart states that the group is equally influenced by Nina Simone and Krzysztof Penderecki, by The Birthday Party and Orchestral Manoeuvres in the Dark (OMD).

Xiu Xiu would tour their first LP Knife Play, and its successor EP, Chapel of the Chimes, in 2002, blending both melody and cacophony with a heavy reliance on percussive instrumentation and brass instrumentation.

Following 2002, the group would shrink in membership as Yvonne Chen left to focus on her vegan boutique Otsu and self-published magazine Zum, while Cory McCulloch also stopped touring, focusing instead on producing the band's next two LPs. A personal loss would affect Xiu Xiu as well, as Jamie Stewart's father, musician and record producer Michael Stewart was found dead after an apparent suicide. Coping with these losses, Stewart would record the group's follow-up to Knife Play, 2003's A Promise.

Continuing to focus on the subject matter of Jamie Stewart's personal life – as witnessed previously by Knife Play – A Promise acts like a concept record of internal despair. Consisting of ten tracks, the record was oriented towards a more or less acoustic presentation, rather than relying on the booming brass and percussion which had worked to make Knife Play. However, the record did not veer from the formulated programming for which Stewart and McCulloch would be praised by fans and critics alike. A Promise also contains a cover of Tracy Chapman's "Fast Car", a version that has been praised for its stripped sound and Stewart's distressing vocals.

During this time, Stewart recorded Fag Patrol, a collection of previous recorded material as well as covers of songs by The Smiths and his previous group with McCulloch, Ten in the Swear Jar. Released as a handmade CD by Rob Fisk's and Kelly Goodefisk's Free Porcupine Society, Fag Patrol was limited to only a few hundred copies (however saw a CD repress in 2005, and a vinyl reissue by Improved Sequence in 2021). In the spring of 2004, Stewart and McCulloch released what is considered by many to be the group's most accessible album, Fabulous Muscles. More pop-friendly in its sound than previous releases, Fabulous Muscles boosted Xiu Xiu to new heights in terms of popularity, largely thanks to its single "I Luv the Valley OH!". The tone of the album reflected an "incredibly, incredibly violent, incredibly jarring, and difficult to take" string of events in Stewart's life. Stewart described his lyrics as "never fictional". He told Pitchfork that Xiu Xiu songs are based around five topics: family, politics, sex, love and lovelessness, suicide, and how they are connected.

With the departure of Lauren Andrews in 2003 – who wished to focus on her academic studies – Stewart was joined on stage by his "long-lost" cousin, Caralee McElroy in 2004. The two would tour relentlessly throughout that year, releasing not only the group's third LP, but also split recordings with This Song Is a Mess But So Am I and Bunkbed, along with the "Fleshettes" single – which featured a rendition of the Ten in the Swear Jar track "Helsabot" by McElroy.

2004–2010: La Forêt to Dear God, I Hate Myself
Seen as a return to Stewart's more dark and crabby demeanor, Xiu Xiu's fourth album La Forêt alluded to a frustration which Stewart had felt throughout the process of recording the 2004 record. Centered around the topic of "horrible times in horrible lives" as well as Stewart's personal frustrations with then-U.S. President George W. Bush, La Forêt is characterized by an altogether different sound – layered by mandolin, harmonium, clarinet, cello, autoharp, and tuba. In addition to La Forêt, Xiu Xiu would join Italian experimental group Larsen in forming XXL, which released its first LP, ¡Ciaütistico!, in 2005, followed later by its successor ¿Spicchiology?, in 2007. Stewart also issued formative splits throughout 2005, working with artists such as The Paper Chase, Kill Me Tomorrow, and Devendra Banhart.

In 2006, Stewart would break from tradition by ending his professional relationship with McCulloch. He then started recording with San Francisco-based band Deerhoof's drummer Greg Saunier as producer for Xiu Xiu's fifth LP entitled The Air Force. Saunier, who had previously worked with Stewart on Knife Play, created for the record a greater wall of sound – a stark contrast to that of McCulloch's discordant attitude towards production. The Air Force would be supported throughout 2006 by a three piece ensemble, as Stewart and McElroy were joined by drummer/percussionist Ches Smith, who himself had previously worked with the group on Knife Play. Produced by Greg Saunier, Stewart said that the album is about "making other people feel bad" instead of feeling bad oneself and the year it was released was "one of the first not dominated by personal tragedies" Its major themes are "guilt and sex as opposed to sorrow and sex". Stewart considered it their best and most consciously pop album yet. He said that the band was obsessed with Weezer's Blue Album and The Smiths's The Queen Is Dead while on tour, though the album does not reflect those albums particularly. The Air Force also contained the band's first album-based songs without vocals by Stewart – with McElroy singing "Hello From Eau Claire", as well as the instrumental piece "Saint Pedro Glue Stick".

A third EP – Tu Mi Piaci ("I like you") – of songs originally recorded by acts such as Bauhaus, Nedelle, Big Star, The Pussycat Dolls, and Nina Simone was released in 2006, along with a collaboration with ambient artist Grouper, entitled Creepshow. Shortly thereafter, Xiu Xiu would record their sixth album, 2008's Women as Lovers. Their longest LP to date, Women as Lovers attempts to hone the synth-pop influences of the group's sound. Stewart's and McElroy's duet with Michael Gira of Swans on a cover of David Bowie and Queen's "Under Pressure" is representative of this. Touring that year alongside Xiu Xiu aluminist Devin Hoff on bass, the band's second four-piece incarnation would not last long, as Hoff abruptly left the group soon after touring began.

In May 2009, it was revealed that Caralee McElroy would no longer work with Xiu Xiu. Speculations ran as to what reasons McElroy had for leaving the group after five years of recording and touring, though no explanation was given other than her subsequent membership in Manhattan-based darkwave group Cold Cave, which she soon after departed from in 2010. With the vacancies left by both Hoff and McElroy, Stewart and Smith recruited Angela Seo in late 2009. Thereafter, the group would begin work on its seventh LP Dear God, I Hate Myself, recording in both Oakland, California as well as Durham, North Carolina. Once again shifting motifs, Xiu Xiu would this time choose to experiment with video game-based programming, using the Nintendo DS to write many of the songs which appear on their 2010 release. The music video for the song "Dear God, I Hate Myself" received attention online in 2010. The video consists of Seo inducing vomiting over the course of the three-minute song, culminating with her vomiting on Stewart, who has been eating a chocolate bar during the entire video. Seo and Stewart have defended the video online and in interviews, stating that the video illustrates the subject of the song in an extreme and visceral fashion.

2010–2017: Always to FORGET
In 2010, Xiu Xiu left Kill Rock Stars and signed with Bella Union and Polyvinyl. Xiu Xiu released Always on these new labels in 2012. It was called "magnificent" and given 5 stars by The Independent and given a 9/10 by Drowned in Sound.

In April 2013, Stewart and Eugene Robinson of Oxbow released the collaborative album Xiu Xiu & Eugene S. Robinson Present: Sal Mineo on Important Records after having toured Europe together in February to promote the project.

In an email sent to fans on January 28, 2013, Xiu Xiu announced that "Ches Smith, Mary Halvorson, Tim Berne, Tony Malaby, Andrea Parkins and Jamie Stewart just finished recording an album in NYC of free jazz and art song versions of all Nina Simone songs." The album, Nina, was released on Graveface Records on December 3, 2013.

In the same email, Xiu Xiu also announced that a new Xiu Xiu album was being made. Xiu Xiu said that it is possible that it will be named Angel Guts: Red Classroom and that "it will be a mean, tight hearted, blackness of Neubauten vs Suicide vs Nico." Angel Guts: Red Classroom was released February 2014. It was given an 8 out of 10 by Drowned in Sound and Mojo. David Hartley of the band War on Drugs praised the album, calling it a "stereoscopic assault."

In June 2015, Xiu Xiu started a new Bandcamp page under the title "xiuxiu69". Since its creation, they have self-described the page as an "ephemera shoppe specializing in exclusive, obscure, out of print, experimental & overlooked zonk." The page is used to host projects such as non-studio Xiu Xiu releases, solo Jamie Stewart albums, ambient projects, out of print Xiu Xiu collaborations and recordings from Jamie Stewart's former band Ten In The Swear Jar. Xiuxiu69 also hosts sales of physical music and merchandise, including LPs of Xiu Xiu material and material loosely related to Xiu Xiu such as Jamie Stewart and Lawrence English's band HEXA.

On November 16, 2016, the band announced their next album FORGET, set for release on February 24, 2017. The announcement was accompanied with lead single "Wondering", signifying a return to more pop-oriented songwriting.

2017–2023: Girl with Basket of Fruit to Ignore Grief 
Xiu Xiu performed a long piece "Deforms the Unborn" based on the demonic possession of children at the Guggenheim Museum in May 2018.

Xiu Xiu released their eleventh new album titled Girl with Basket of Fruit on February 8, 2019, via Polyvinyl.

In April 2020, Xiu Xiu started a Bandcamp subscription service titled "XIU MUTHA FUCKIN XIU". At its basic tier, it grants access to a monthly "XIU MUTHA FUCKIN XIU" digital audio package, consisting of a new fully produced cover (notable examples being Xiu Xiu renditions of "Dancing On My Own", "In The Garage" and "Dancing with a Stranger"), an exclusive solo Xiu Xiu song, and an edition of the 12 chapter 120 part experimental piece "Lamentation". So far, two chapters of "Lamentation" have been revealed, chapter one being Spider Lamentation and chapter two being Woodpecker Lamentation. Tier two grants all the above and "30 to 50 license free samples, full stems of one Xiu Xiu song for non commercial exploration". Tier three includes the benefits from tiers one and two and a unique hand-made postcard illustrated by Angela Seo or Jamie Stewart with a haiku written to you and posted on the Xiuxiu69 Bandcamp page.

Their twelfth album, Oh No, was released on March 26, 2021. Its lead single, "A Bottle of Rum" featuring Liz Harris, was released along with the album's announcement on January 27, 2021. Its second single, "Rumpus Room" featuring Liars, was released on March 4, 2021.

"Maybae Baeby", the first single from their thirteenth studio album Ignore Grief, was released on January 12, 2023. The album features new member David Kendrick, formerly of Sparks and Devo.

Band members 
Current members
 Jamie Stewart – production, vocals, percussion, guitar, synthesizers, keyboards, piano, programming, bass, organ, harmonium, viola (2002–present)
 Angela Seo – production, vocals, percussion, piano, synthesizers, programming, organ, harmonium (2009–present)
 David Kendrick - production, percussion (2022–present)

Former members
 Ches Smith – drums, percussion, synthesizers, vocals (2006–2018)
 Shayna Dunkelman – drums, vibraphone, synthesizers, percussion (2012–2017)
 Cory McCulloch – production, bass guitar, mandolin, synthesizers (2002–2009)
 Caralee McElroy – production, synthesizers, piano, harmonium, percussion, flute, vocals (2004–2009)
 Devin Hoff – double bass, bass guitar, acoustic bass (2008)
 Lauren Andrews – synthesizers, keyboards, piano, percussion (2002–2004)
 Yvonne Chen – synthesizers, percussion, trumpet (2002–2003)
 Thor Harris – percussion (2019)
 Marc Riordan – percussion (2012)
 Zac Pennington – multi-instrumentalist (2011)
 Christopher Pravdica – bass (2019)

Timeline

Name and musical style 
The band's name comes from the film Xiu Xiu: The Sent Down Girl. The band found its first tracks to match the "rotten realness" spirit of the film, "that sometimes life turns out with a worst possible case scenario". Stewart said Tracy Chapman's "Fast Car", which Xiu Xiu covered on A Promise, had a similar theme.

Stewart has added that the band was a product of San Jose pirate radio stations that played house, hi-NRG, freestyle, and techno, which Stewart considered unpretentious, plain, heartbroken, clear, and based around dancing away sadness. He said he wrote his first Xiu Xiu song after leaving a San Jose dance club alone on a Christmas night: "Xiu Xiu came from feeling stupid and lonely and then wanting to dance it away, but having the club and its music only magnify that stupid and lonely feeling." At the time of A Promise, Stewart said that he was influenced by gamelan and Japanese and Korean folk music, and had been listening to contemporary classical and "gay dance music".

Live performances 
In 2003, Stewart told Pitchfork that the band's live shows were starkly different from the recorded material. He said this was largely due to the technical limitations of being able to reproduce the way it was recorded. In their live shows, the band increased the intensity of their loud rock parts, though Stewart reported their set to be half "louder, more dance-y stuff" and half "really quiet stuff". He said the latter was sometimes at odds with the type of venues they played.

Reception 

Metro Silicon Valleys David Espinoza likened Stewart to an explorer charting new territories of sound in 2001 as he started Xiu Xiu. He compared Stewart's voice to a combination of Robert Smith's fragility and The Downward Spiral-era Trent Reznor's anger, and noted Stewart's deliberate and considered choices towards developing the band's tone in light of the disparate wackiness of the individual instruments.

Brandon Stosuy of Pitchfork noted a "continual poetic and romantic beauty" behind "the violence" in Stewart's lyrics. He wrote that the band inspired fandom of the kind where teenage girls ask for Stewart's autograph.

Discography

Studio albums 
 Knife Play (2002)
 A Promise (2003)
 Fabulous Muscles (2004)
 La Forêt (2005)
 The Air Force (2006)
 Women as Lovers (2008)
 Dear God, I Hate Myself (2010)
 Always (2012)
 Angel Guts: Red Classroom (2014)
 Forget (2017)
 Girl with Basket of Fruit (2019)
 Oh No (2021)
 Ignore Grief (2023)

Other releases

 Chapel of the Chimes (2002)
 Fag Patrol (2003)
 Tu Mi Piaci (2006)
 Nina (2013)
 Unclouded Sky (2014)
 Plays the Music of Twin Peaks (2016)

References

External links
 

American experimental rock groups
American synth-pop groups
American art rock groups
Indie rock musical groups from California
Musical groups from San Jose, California
LGBT-themed musical groups
Bella Union artists
Kill Rock Stars artists
Absolutely Kosher Records artists
2002 establishments in California
Musical groups established in 2002